The Paterson Biplane was an early British biplane designed by Cecil Compton Paterson and built at the Liverpool Motor House, where Paterson was a director. It was later called the Paterson No. 1 Biplane to distinguish it from subsequent aircraft designed by Paterson.

Design and development
Built between 1909 and 1910, the Paterson Biplane was a similar design to the Curtiss Biplane. It was an open-framed pusher biplane with a main frame  made from bamboo and a tubular steel tricycle landing gear. It had a biplane front elevator and a single rear elevator with a rudder. It first flew from the beach at Freshfield north of Liverpool on 14 May 1910. It flew a second time on 23 June 1910 but was damaged: after repair it was used by Paterson to obtain his aviator's certificate which was issued in December 1910. He built a second Biplane with a larger engine for Gerald Higginbotham, later called Biplane No. 2. This was completed in January 1911 . Both aircraft were based at Freshfield.

Variants

Biplane No. 1
Anzani powered early biplane.
Biplane No. 2
Similar aircraft with a  Gnome air-cooled rotary engine.

Specifications (No. 1)

References

Notes

1910s British experimental aircraft
Single-engined pusher aircraft
Aircraft first flown in 1910